Huw David  is a Welsh Labour politician and leader of Bridgend County Borough Council since October 2016.

Background

A resident of Cefn Cribbwr, David became the county borough councillor for his area in 2004.

He served as a backbencher until he was re-elected in 2008 and appointed Cabinet Member for Resources.

In 2012 he changed portfolios, taking on the role of Cabinet Member for Children and Young People. He was also appointed Deputy Leader in 2015.

After Mel Nott resigned as Leader in 2016, David was elected as his successor. 

Under David’s Leadership, in the 2022 elections Welsh Labour won overall control of Bridgend County Borough Council for the first time since 2012. In May 2022 he was re-elected as council leader. He was honoured as an Officer of the Order of the British Empire in June 2022.

References 

Welsh politicians

Year of birth missing (living people)
Living people
Officers of the Order of the British Empire